Miles is the plural of mile.

Miles may also refer to:

People with the name
 Miles (given name)
 Miles (surname)

Places

United States 
 Miles, Iowa, a city
 Miles, North Carolina, an unincorporated community
 Miles, Texas, a city
 Miles, Virginia, an unincorporated community
 Miles, Washington, an unincorporated community
 Miles, West Virginia, an unincorporated community
 Miles, Wisconsin, an unincorporated community
 Fort Miles, a former American military installation on Cape Henlopen near Lewes, Delaware
 Miles City, Florida, an unincorporated community
 Miles City, Montana
 Miles Glacier, Alaska
 Miles Lake, Alaska
 Miles River, Maryland
 Miles Township, Centre County, Pennsylvania

Elsewhere 
 Miles, Queensland, Australia, a town
 Miles Islands, Nunavut, Canada

Brands and enterprises
 Miles Aircraft Ltd, a UK manufacturer of light and military aircraft
 Miles Electric Vehicles, a former manufacturer and distributor of all-electric vehicles based in California; declared bankruptcy in 2013
 Miles Laboratories, an American pharmaceutical company
 Miles Mausoleum, two mausoleums in the US

Computing and Technology
 Miles Sound System, a two-dimensional sound software system primarily for computer games
 Multiple Integrated Laser Engagement System or MILES, a method of simulating battle used by US Armed Forces

Education
 Miles College, Fairfield, Alabama, an historically black college founded in 1898
 Miles Community College, Miles City, Montana

Music 
 Miles (band), a Bangladeshi rock band, or their 1982 debut album
 Miles: From an Interlude Called Life, an album by Blu & Exile, 2020
 Miles: The New Miles Davis Quintet, a 1956 album
 Miles! Miles! Miles!, a 1993 album by Miles Davis
 Miles! The Definitive Miles Davis at Montreux DVD Collection, a box set
 Miles, an album by Topic, or the title song, 2015
 Miles, an EP by the Vasco Era, 2005
 "Miles", a song by Christina Perri from Lovestrong (2011)
 "Miles", a song by Sponge from Rotting Piñata (1994)
 "Miles", a song by SZA from the 2022 deluxe edition of Ctrl (2017)

Sports
 Miles (mascot), the official mascot of the Denver Broncos NFL football 
 Miles Field (Oregon), a former professional baseball stadium in Medford, Oregon
 Miles Field (Virginia Tech), a former collegiate sports venue
 Miles Stadium, a former stadium in Blacksburg, Virginia, on the campus of Virginia Polytechnic Institute and State University

Other uses 
 Miles baronets, a title in the Baronetage of the United Kingdom
 Miles: The Autobiography, a 1989 book by Miles Davis and Quincy Troupe
 Miles (film), a 2016 drama film starring Molly Shannon

See also 
 Mile (disambiguation)
 Myles (given name)
 Myles (surname)
 Justice Miles (disambiguation)